Temminck's babbler (Pellorneum pyrrogenys) is a species of bird in the family Pellorneidae.  It is found in Borneo and Java. Its natural habitat is subtropical or tropical moist lowland forest.

This bird's common name commemorates the Dutch naturalist Coenraad Jacob Temminck.

References
Notes

Sources
Collar, N. J. & Robson, C. 2007. Family Timaliidae (Babblers)  pp. 70 – 291 in; del Hoyo, J., Elliott, A. & Christie, D.A. eds. Handbook of the Birds of the World, Vol. 12. Picathartes to Tits and Chickadees. Lynx Edicions, Barcelona.

Pellorneum
Birds of Borneo
Birds of Java
Birds described in 1827
Taxonomy articles created by Polbot
Taxobox binomials not recognized by IUCN